Qızılhacılı or Kyzylgadzhily or Kyzylgadzhyly may refer to:
Qızılhacılı, Goranboy, Azerbaijan
Qızılhacılı, Qazakh, Azerbaijan